Butterfly orchid is a common name for several orchids and may refer to:

 Psychopsis, any species
 Platanthera, any species
 Sarcochilus, several species
 Anacamptis papilionacea (formerly in Orchis)
 Encyclia tampensis
 Epidendrum venosum
 Habenaria psycodes 
 Platanthera chlorantha (the greater butterfly orchid of Europe)
 Platanthera bifolia (the lesser butterfly orchid of Europe)
 Polyrrhiza lindenii
 Phalaenopsis aphrodite